Jean Stevo (28 May 1914 – 7 November 1974) was a Belgian painter and engraver.

Biography
Born in Brussels in 1914, Stevo became active in European artistic life with his first exhibition in 1936. Among his friends and associates may be counted figures such as James Ensor, Félix Labisse, Jean Cocteau, René Magritte, Paul Delvaux, and Max Ersnt.  Jean Cassou, the Director of the National Museum of Modern Art in Paris commented on Stevo's work: "In his varied activities, Jean Stevo has devoted himself to a lyrical effusion, to the fantastic of the imagination, to the shadows of human destiny. the clear structure of his work clings to the page and, at the same time, animates it like a poem always vibrant with life." Jean Stevo was invited to participate in the Venice Biennal (Biennale di Venezia), both in 1954 and 1962. In 1969, at the invitation of John Hersey, he had a solo show at Yale University (April 27- May 27), followed by another show in 1972 at the Athena gallery (New Haven, Ct). A retrospective of Stevo'art work took place in 1975 under the auspices of the Maison française at Columbia University.

The paintings, drawings, and graphic works of Jean Stevo have been exhibited throughout the world. He was asked to exhibit at the salon des "Réalités Nouvelles" at the Museum of Modern Art in Paris, the Biennale of Engraving at Lugano (1960), and the Biennale delle Regioni at Ancona (1968.) Stevo received wide critical acclaim, from the Prize in Engraving (Art Jeune, 1942) to the Critics Mendal of "La Nuova Critica Europea" (1969.) His works now figure in the principal museums and collections of Europe, including the Cabinet des Estampes of the Bibliothèque Nationale in Paris, the Rijksmuseum and Stedelijk Museum in Amsterdam, the National Museum of Cracow, Poland, the Royal Belgian Academy in Brussels, and the Harvard Art Center. 
Stevo is also known for his poetry, short stories, and other writings. In 1973 the Académie Royale de Langue et de Littérature française de Belgique awarded Jean Stevo the Léopold Rosy Prize for his book on Michel de Ghelderode.

Selected works
Poetry & Fiction
La Chanson Grise, Paris, 1966
La Nuit de Hollande, Paris,
America-America, Paris,1969 (illustrations by Marie-Rose Mabille)
Haute Solitude
Lettres de Nulle Part, 1971 (poetry & etchings)

James Ensor, Editions Germinal, 1947
Marie Howet, Monographies de l'Art Belge, 1954
Paul Maas, Monographies de l'Art Belge, 1961
Hommage à James Ensor, Brepols,1960
Office des Ténèbres pour Michel de Ghelderode, 1972
Cinematography: Le simple bonheur d'Edgard Tytgat,1953 (with Steppé & Lovrix)

References

E. Benezit, Dictionnaire des peintres, sculpteurs, dessinateurs et graveurs.Oxford University Press, 1999
James Ensor, Lettres à Jean Stevo, 1935–38, Getty RI Library Catalog
Philippe Roberts-Jones, Le dictionnaire des peintres belges du XIVème siècle à nos jours, Bruxelles, La renaissance du livre, 1995
Marc Eemans, L'art vivant en Belgique, Bruxelles, 1972, p. 192
A. van Wiermeersch, Contemporary Painters and Sculptors in Belgium, Ghent, 1973, pp. 228–229
Louis Lebeer, La gravure contemporaine, 1971/Hedendaagse Graveerkunst in België, Provinciale Bibliotheek van Limburg
Arto, Dictionnaire des arts plastiques en Belgique
Paul Piron, Dictionnaire des artistes plasticiens en Belgique des XXIème et XXème siècles
Thierry Denoel, Le petit dictionnaire des Belges, Bruxelles: Editions Le Cri,1993, p. 600
Columbia Dictionary of European Literature, ed. Jean-Albert Bédé, Columbia University Press, 1980
Robert Frickx & Raymond Trousson,  française de Belgique, Poésie, Bruxelles: Académie Royale de Langue et de  française de Belgique

Stevo, Jean (1971). Jean Stevo.

1914 births
1974 deaths
20th-century Belgian painters